Star Trek II: Starship Combat Simulator is a 1984 board game published by FASA.

Gameplay
Star Trek II: Starship Combat Simulator is a starship combat simulation that provides four games: the Basic, Advanced, and Expert Starship Tactics and "Command & Control", a role-playing system.

Reception
Steve Crow reviewed Star Trek II: Starship Combat Simulator in Space Gamer No. 71. Crow commented that "While I would recommend the game to anyone who owns the roleplaying version of Star Trek, it is not the best fleet tactics or one-on-one starship battle system on the market today. Its best use is to enhance the starship combat system in the RPG, and this it does excellently."

References

Board games based on Star Trek
Board games introduced in 1984
FASA games